Nerine undulata syn. N. crispa is a species of flowering plant in the subfamily Amaryllidoideae of the family Amaryllidaceae, that is native to the eastern Cape of South Africa.

The Latin specific epithet undulata means “wavy, undulating”, in reference to the crinkled tepals of the flowers.

A white-flowered cultivar, N. undulata (Flexuosa Group) ‘Alba’, has been given the Royal Horticultural Society’s Award of Garden Merit. It is hardy in mild or coastal areas of the UK, but requires a sunny, sheltered spot.

References

Flora of the Cape Provinces
Amaryllidoideae
Plants described in 1820